Ghisi Piti Mohabbat is a Pakistani dark humor television series produced by Abdullah Seja under their banner iDream Entertainment. It premiered on 6 August 2020 on ARY Digital. Written by Fasih Bari Khan of Quddusi Sahab Ki Bewah fame, it stars Ramsha Khan as the main protagonist whereas Wahaj Ali, Shahood Alvi, Ali Abbas, and Danial Afzal as second leads.

Summary 
The serial follows the life of an independent and confident girl, Samia (Ramsha Khan) who works as a chef in a restaurant. She got married again after her first divorce as her first husband, Rizwan (Wahaj Ali) was not loyal to her. Her second husband, Khalil (Shahood Alvi) is murdered by his first wife on their wedding night. After his death, Samiya marries Basharat (Ali Abbas), a young guy who works with Samia and lives with his widowed sister-in-law, Amtul (Javeria Abbasi) and nephew, Salman (Zuhab Khan). A little while after their wedding Salman dies. After his death, Basharat feels bad for his sister-in-law, Amtul and decides to marry her. This time, again it becomes difficult for Samia to pursue her marital life due to Amtul's interference and she decides to leave Basharat, disappointing her mother. She also loses her job because the restaurant shuts down and she is forced to search for a new job. It is very difficult for her to hold onto any job because she is harassed wherever she goes, so she decides to open her own restaurant and succeeds in it. A new guy named Uzair (Danial Afzal Khan) comes into her life and asks her to marry him but she rejects him as she sees his flirting nature with another woman.

In the end, Samia decides to live her life as an independent girl. She doesn't want to marry anyone anymore and wants to reach the sky independently. 
The serial ends by showing her taking each step towards her success in life.

Cast 
 Ramsha Khan as Samia
 Wahaj Ali as Rizwan, Samia's first husband
 Shahood Alvi as Khalil, Samia's second husband (dead) 
 Ali Abbas as Basharat, Samia's third husband
 Danial Afzal Khan as Uzair, Samia's neighbor
 Saba Faisal as Fareeda, Samia's mother
 Sajeer Uddin as Anwar, Samia's father
 Samina Ahmed as Tanveer Fatima, Samia's phuppo (aunt)
 Aliha Chaudry as Asmara, Samia's younger sister
 Areesha Ahsan as Tashi, Samia's youngest sister
 Saba Hameed as Aziza Sultana, Rizwan's mother
 Saife Hassan as Naheed, Rizwan's father
 Sana Askari as Farhat Parveen, Rizwan's sister
 Arjumand Rahim as Noor, Rizwan's friend
 Hareem Sohail as Saman, Noor's daughter
 Umar Cheema as Bilal, Rizwan's friend
 Farah Nadir as Bilal's mother
 Zahid Qureshi as Bilal's father
 Afshan Qureshi as Nafeesa Sherwani, Khalil's mother
 Shaheen Khan as Farkhnda, Khalil's first wife
 Hamid Naveed as Yasir, Khalil and Farkhanda's son
 Javeria Abbasi as Amtul, Bsharat's sister-in-law
 Zuhab Khan as Salman, Amtul's elder son (dead)
 Beena Chaudhary as Bee, Uzair's elder sister
 Abul Hassan as Shoaib, Asmara's husband
 Zohaib Mirza as Riz, writer and Tashi's friend
 Fareeda Shabbir as Rubeena, Shoaib's mother
 Nida Khan as Chanchal, a famous actress

Production 
The show was earlier named as Meri Chaar Shadiyaan but later it changed to Ghisi Piti Mohabbat. The writer of the show, Faseeh Bari Khan revealed in an interview that it is based on a true story.

Wahaj and Ramsha made their second on-screen appearance by this serial after their appearance in Mah-e-Tamaam (2018).

Reception

Critical reception
Writing for Dawn Images, Sadaf Haider praised the Ghisi Piti Mohabbat and ranked it as a best serial of the year. She wrote, "Despite its cynical title, Ghissi Pitti Mohabbat could easily have been a great romance—the kind that bets on a flip of a coin as the characters learn what is truly valuable in life." A reviewer from Daily Times praised the Ramsha Khan's character and performance and serial's writing, execution and its multiple genres stating, "The show is a sweet combo of comedy and quirkiness with romance, melodrama, family dynamics, and societal norms splashed across the story. It is equal parts sweet, heartfelt, funny to laugh out loud hilarious in most scenes, and the show’s narrative is fresh, gripping, and thoroughly entertaining." At annual ARY People's Choice Awards, Fasih Bari Khan, Saba Faisal and Ramsha Khan won Favourite Writer, Favourite Actress in a Role of Maa and Favourite Actress respectively.

Ratings

Awards and nominations

References

External links 
 Official website
 

Pakistani comedy television series
2020 Pakistani television series debuts
ARY Digital original programming